Thomas C. MacAvoy (April 24, 1928 - May 28, 2015) served as the President of the Boy Scouts of America.

Background
In 1988, MacAvoy was awarded the 192nd Bronze Wolf, the only distinction of the World Organization of the Scout Movement, awarded by the World Scout Committee for exceptional services to world Scouting. He was one of only six men to hold all four top-tier Scouting awards, the Bronze Wolf, the Silver Buffalo, the Silver Antelope, and the Distinguished Eagle Scout Award.

References

External links

https://www.hillandwood.com/obituary/3125189

Recipients of the Bronze Wolf Award
1928 births
2015 deaths
Presidents of the Boy Scouts of America